Stenophylacini is a tribe of northern caddisflies in the family Limnephilidae. There are at least 20 genera and 190 described species in Stenophylacini.

The type genus for Stenophylacini is Stenophylax F. Kolenati, 1848.

Genera
These 24 genera belong to the tribe Stenophylacini:

 Acrophylax Brauer, 1867 i c g
 Allogamus Schmid, 1955 i c g
 Anisogamodes Martynov, 1924 i c g
 Anisogamus McLachlan, 1874 i c g
 Chionophylax Schmid, 1951 i c g
 Chyranda Ross, 1944 i
 Clostoeca Banks, 1943 i c g b
 Consorophylax Schmid, 1955 i c g
 Enoicyla Rambur, 1842 i c g
 Enoicylopsis Navas, 1917 i c g
 Halesus Stephens, 1836 i c g
 Hydatophylax Wallengren, 1891 i c g b
 Isogamus Schmid, 1955 i c g
 Leptotaulius Schmid, 1955 i c g
 Melampophylax Schmid, 1955 i c g
 Mesophylax McLachlan, 1882 i c g
 Parachiona Thomson, 1891 i c g
 Philocasca Ross, 1941 i c g b
 Platyphylax McLachlan, 1871 i c g
 Potamophylax Wallengren, 1891 i c g
 Psilopterna Martynov, 1915 i c g
 Pycnopsyche Banks, 1905 i c g b
 Stenophylax Kolenati, 1848 i c g
 † Tricheopteryx Cockerell, 1927

Data sources: i = ITIS, c = Catalogue of Life, g = GBIF, b = Bugguide.net

References

Further reading

External links

Trichoptera tribes
Articles created by Qbugbot
Integripalpia